Meatball (born Logan Jennings) is a Black American drag queen, performer, and podcaster. She was a contestant on The Boulet Brothers' Dragula season 1, co-host of podcast Sloppy Seconds, and went viral for her drag performance of politician George Santos.

Career 
Meatball began her career performing in the Los Angeles drag scene after being inspired by RuPaul's Drag Race. Before the television version, Meatball also won the club contest version of Dragula, whose other winners include fellow Dragula season 1 contestant Pinche and RuPaul's Drag Race contestant Valentina. 

She was a contestant on Dragula season 1, where she took fourth place and was the "fan favorite" winner. She returned in a cameo skit during the last supper of season 2. 

Meatball also co-hosts the podcast Sloppy Seconds with rapper and producer Big Dipper as part of the Moguls Of Media (MOM) Network, created by Drag Race contestants Alaska and Willam. The pair also hosted the podcast UnBEARable prior to Sloppy Seconds. 

Meatball was also the live correspondent for dating app Hornet for RuPaul's Drag Con and other LGBT nightlife events. Meatball also currently hosts the drag show Fat Slut at Precinct Club in Los Angeles, the show has also toured to different cities across the United States. 

On February 26th, 2023, Meatball performed at Sasha Velour's monthly drag showcase NightGowns at the Le Poisson Rouge in New York City as George Santos's alleged drag persona Kitara Ravache to Kesha's "This is My Life." A clip of the performance went viral on TikTok and Instagram and was featured on an episode of Jimmy Kimmel Live!.

Filmography

Television

Web series

Podcasts

References 

Living people
American drag queens
African-American drag queens
American podcasters
American comedians
Gay comedians
American LGBT comedians